The Top Holiday Albums chart is a seasonal chart published weekly by Billboard during the holiday months of each year. It tracks the best-selling Christmas and holiday albums in the United States. Throughout the 2020s, many albums, compilation albums, extended plays, and soundtrack albums reached the top spot of the chart.

Chart history

See also 
 List of Billboard number one Holiday Digital Song Sales of the 2020s
 Billboard Christmas Holiday Charts
 List of best-selling Christmas albums in the United States

References

External links 
 Current Top Holiday Albums chart at Billboard

Holiday albums
United States Holiday Albums